Manheim Township School District is a suburban, public school district of over 5,000 students in nine schools located in Manheim Township, Lancaster County, Pennsylvania. The district is well known in the Lancaster County region for its academic achievement, popular quiz bowl team, and performing arts group. The district's public school population of almost 6,000 students in kindergarten through twelfth grades is distributed over twenty-four school buildings: there are six elementary schools (grades K-4), a single 5th and 6th-grade building, one middle school (grades 7 & 8), and one high school (grades 9-12). The district students are 67% white, 9% Asian, 5% black, 13% Hispanic, and 7% Multi-racial. The district's high school finished construction in 2008. The district's Manheim Township Landis Run Intermediate finished construction in 2012.

The district's colors are blue and white. A traditional rival of the district is Warwick.

See also
 Manheim Township High School
 Manheim Township

References

External links
MTSD community info
Manheim Township School District official Web site

School districts in Lancaster County, Pennsylvania